The following is a list of ecoregions in Lesotho as identified by the World Wide Fund for Nature (WWF).

Terrestrial
Lesotho is in the Afrotropical realm. Its three ecoregions are in the montane grasslands and shrublands biome.
 Drakensberg alti-montane grasslands and woodlands
 Drakensberg montane grasslands, woodlands and forests
 Highveld grasslands

Freshwater
 Drakensberg - Maloti Highlands
 Southern Temperate Highveld

Lesotho
 
ecoregions